Alejandro Woss y Gil (born Alejandro Woss Linares) (May 5, 1856 – January 1, 1932) was a Dominican politician and military figure.

He was born in El Seibo on May 5, 1856, to parents, Carlos Woss and María Linares. At a young age he was sent Santiago de los Caballeros to live with his uncle Gen. Evangelista Gil, who adopted him and encouraged to enter military service.

Woss y Gil served as Minister of Defense and as vice president during the presidency of Francisco Gregorio Billini, whom he replaced after his resignation from May 16, 1885, until January 6, 1887. Former president Ulises Heureaux remained the dominant figure in national politics. In 1903, he led a coup against Juan Isidro Jimenes and served again as president from March 23 until he was removed by Carlos Felipe Morales on October 24, 1903.

Woss was married to María Altagracia Ricart. Together, the couple had three children: Ana María, Francisco, and Celeste Woss y Gil, who became a noted painter and artist.

He died in Santo Domingo in January 1932.

References

Biography at the Enciclopedia Virtual Dominicana

|-

|-

|-

1856 births
1932 deaths
19th-century Dominican Republic politicians
20th-century Dominican Republic politicians
People from El Seibo Province
Presidents of the Dominican Republic
Vice presidents of the Dominican Republic
Government ministers of the Dominican Republic
Dominican Republic people of Canarian descent
Dominican Republic people of French descent
Dominican Republic people of German descent
Ambassadors of the Dominican Republic to the United States
White Dominicans